The 2016–17 Russian Cup was the 25th season of the Russian football knockout tournament since the dissolution of Soviet Union.

The competition started on 15 July 2016. The cup champion won a spot in the 2017–18 UEFA Europa League group stage.

First round
The games were played on 15 and 16 July 2016.

Ural-Povolzhye

South

West and Centre

Second round
The games were played on 24 and 25 July 2016.
East

Ural-Povolzhye

South

West and Centre

Third round
The games were played on 1 August and 7–8 August 2016. 
East

South

West and Centre

Ural-Povolzhye

Fourth round
The games were played on 24 and 25 August 2016.

Bracket

Round of 32
Teams from the Premier League enter the competition at this round. The games were played on 21 and 22 September 2016.

Round of 16
The games were played on 26 and 27 October 2016.

Quarter-finals
The games were played on 28 February and 1 March 2017.

Semi-finals
The games were played on 5 and 6 April 2017.

Final

References

External links
 Official page 

Russian Cup seasons
Cup
Russian Cup